Ta' Xbiex Waterpolo Club is a waterpolo club from Ta' Xbiex, Malta.

For sponsorship reasons, the club is known as Ta' Xbiex Amigos.

Current squad
As at June 12, 2018:
 Miguel Vassallo
 Raoul Greco
 Malcolm Manara
 Luke Hyzler
 Benji Cachia
 Kurt Mock
 Gareth Blundell
 Nikola Dedović
 Liam Galea
 Keith Tanti
 Niall Saliba
 Liam Pace

References

External links
Official Website

Water polo clubs in Malta
Ta' Xbiex